Ants Erm (born 1 September 1953 Tallinn) is an Estonian marine scientist and politician. He was a member of VII Riigikogu.

References

Living people
1953 births
Estonian National Independence Party politicians
Isamaa politicians
Members of the Riigikogu, 1992–1995
Academic staff of the University of Tartu
Tallinn University of Technology alumni
Politicians from Tallinn